The list of shipwrecks in July 1827 includes some ships sunk, wrecked or otherwise lost during July 1827.

2 July

3 July

10 July

11 July

12 July

14 July

16 July

23 July

26 July

28 July

31 July

Unknown date

References

1827-07